Ashnan or Ezina (dŠE.TIR; both possible readings are used interchangeably) was a Mesopotamian goddess considered to be the personification of grain. She could also be called Ezina-Kusu, which lead to the proposal that the goddess Kusu was initially her epithet which only developed into a distinct figure later on. She was already worshiped in the Uruk period, and appears in documents from many Mesopotamian cities from the third millennium BCE. She is also known from various works of Mesopotamian literature, such as the debate poem Debate between Sheep and Grain.

Names and character
The logogram dŠE.TIR can be read as both Ezina and Ashnan. According to Jeremy Black, both are used interchangeably to refer to the same deity in modern publications. Frank Simons argues the latter can be understood as the "Akkadianised version" of Ezina. The Sumerian word ezina was also a common noun referring to grain. The Akkadian ašnan could be interpreted the same way. However, the precise etymology of both is uncertain. The goddess designated by these names was associated with grain and agriculture. Early on in her history, she was a major deity, but in later periods she was simply perceived as the divine hypostasis of grain. In addition to her primary role, she could be invoked alongside Nintur to stop post-natal bleeding.

It is possible that in art, Ashnan was depicted as a goddess surrounded by grain-like plants. In some cases this figure is depicted seated on a throne.

Ezina-Kusu
The compound theonym Ezina-Kusu, which combines the names of Ezina and Kusu, a purification goddess, is well attested. The Akkadian form Ashnan-Kusu is also used in scholarship. It already appears in sources from the Early Dynastic period. In most texts, it seemingly designates a deity analogous to Ezina, for example an inscription on one of the Gudea cylinders states that "Ezina-Kusu, the pure stalk, will raise its head high in the furrows in Gu-edina," while The Debate between Sheep and Grain uses the double name interchangeably with that of the grain goddess. Frank Simons has suggested that Kusu was not a distinct goddess at first, but rather an epithet, and only developed into a separate figure at a later date. However, it has also been argued that Kusu treated as an epithet was not related to the purification goddess, and should be understood as a generic appellation, "goddess filled with purity." Ezina-Kusu is also attested as an epithet referring to Nisaba and Aruru in their respective vegetation-related roles.

Worship
The Mesopotamian grain goddess was already worshiped in the Uruk period. According to the Archaic City List, a settlement named after her existed somewhere in Mesopotamia, though the reading of its full name remains unknown. She is one of the oldest attested city goddesses, with Nisaba, Nanshe, Inanna of Uruk and Inanna of Zabalam being the only other ones present in texts of comparable age. In an Early Dynastic zame hymn, her city is instead AB×ŠUŠ (U2), but the reading of this name also remains unknown. She is also present in the Fara and Abu Salabikh god lists. She was worshiped in Lagash, Adab, Umma, Ur, Nippur and Shuruppak. Joan Goodnick Westenholz suggested that in Nippur she was worshiped in the temple of Kusu, which according to Andrew R. George likely bore the name Esaĝĝamaḫ, "house of the exalted purifier." Alfonso Archi notes that she also occurs in a bilingual lexical list from Ebla, which gives the equation dAšnan = A-za-na-an, but she is absent from the administrative texts from this city. Theophoric names invoking her are known from various sources from the third millennium BCE. For example, multiple individuals named Amar-Ashnan ("young bull of Ashnan") appear in texts from Adab from the Early Dynastic and Sargonic periods. The same name, as well as other ones, such as Ashnan-amamu ("Ashnan is my mother"), are also attested in texts from Lagash.

A formula from the reign of Ishme-Dagan refers to Ezina, Enki, Ishkur and Šumugan as the "lords of abundance" (en ḫegallakene). The name Ashnan appears in a curse formula of Yahdun-Lim of Mari, in which she is invoked alongside Šumugan to punish anyone who would remove this king's foundation deposits by impoverishing his land. Some attestations of Ashnan are available from the corpus of Old Babylonian personal letters as well, where she appears with comparable frequency to Bau or Nisaba, though less often than the most popular goddesses, such as Ishtar, Annunitum or Aya. Seals inscribed with the formula "servant of Ashnan" or "servant of Ezina" are known too.

Mythology
The debate poem Debate between Sheep and Grain involves Ashnan arguing with Laḫar (U8), a sheep deity, over which of them is more important. The text begins with an account of creation, which relays that both of them were created because mankind had no food to eat and no clothes to wear. Both Ashnan and Laḫar raise many arguments in favor of their respective claim to superiority, but eventually Enki convinces Enlil to declare the grain goddess the winner, which according to Jeremy Black might reflect the belief that grain was more crucial for survival of mankind than domestic animals were.

An Early Dynastic myth, Tale of Ezina and her Seven Children, is known from multiple copies, and apparently relays how the eponymous goddess, after having sex with a partner whose identity remains uncertain, gives birth to seven children, who seemingly were responsible with providing the world with some type of food which was previously unknown, presumably bread. Julia M. Asher-Greve proposes that a goddess with plants on her robe who in one case accompanies the possible enthroned depiction of Ezina represents one of her seven children from this myth.

Ezina is mentioned in the myth Enki and the World Order, in which she is called "the good bread of the whole world."

An incantation recited during the renovation of a temple lists Ashnan among deities created by Ea from clay.

References

Bibliography

External links

The debate between Sheep and Grain in the Electronic Text Corpus of Sumerian Literature
Enki and the World Order in the ETCSL

Mesopotamian goddesses
Agricultural goddesses